Zeger Jacob van Helmont (1683 in Antwerp – 1726 in Brussels), was a Flemish painter and tapestry designer who specialized in portraits and history paintings.  He trained with his father in Antwerp but spent his active career in Brussels where he worked for the local churches and tapestry works.

Life
Zeger Jacob van Helmont was born in Antwerp as the son of the history and portrait painter Jan van Helmont and Isabella le Rousseau.  He trained with his father but did not join the local Guild of Saint Luke in Antwerp.  Instead, he moved in 1711 to Brussels, the capital of the Spanish Netherlands and the location of the court.  In Brussels he joined the local Guild of Saint Luke in the hope of finding a ready market for his work.

As the result of the 1695 Bombardment of Brussels by French troops many churches, guilds and the local authorities ordered new artworks to replace those destroyed during the bombardment.  Van Helmont secured many commissions from these institutions.  He also found work to make cartoons for the local tapestry works.

He died in Brussels.

Work

He is known for paintings and tapestry designs of historical allegories, religious compositions and portraits painted in a Classicist style.   He made a number of portraits, which were engraved, such as the Portrait of Bruno van der Dussen, regent of Gouda, which was engraved by Bernard Picart.  He also painted a portrait of his fellow painter Jacques Ignatius de Roore (1712, Musée des beaux-arts de Valenciennes).

He executed various religious works for the Brussels churches.

Van Helmont made cartoons for the Brussels workshops.  The Leyniers workshop ordered a series of cartoons on Ovid's Metamorphoses and van Helmont copied works of the French artist Charles de La Fosse for this commission.  He also made a series of scenes of country life 'after Teniers' together with the landscape painter Augustin Coppens.

References

External links

Flemish Baroque painters
Flemish portrait painters
Flemish history painters
Flemish tapestry artists
Artists from Antwerp
Artists from Brussels
Painters from Brussels
1683 births
1726 deaths
18th-century Flemish painters